= Panjeta =

- village
- Location in Punjab, India Panjeta (India)
- Coordinates: 30.900574°N 76.083932°E
- Country: India
- State: Punjab
- District: Ludhiana

Population (2011)
  - Total: 1,761
- Time zone: UTC+5:30 (IST)
- literacy rate: 73.94
- Sex ratio: 1.09

Panjeta is a village located in the Ludhiana district of Punjab, India.

== Demographics ==
According to the 2011 Census of India, Panjeta had a population of 1761. Males and females constituted 52.13 per cent and 47.87 per cent respectively of the population. Literacy at that time was 73.94 per cent, which was lower than the state average of 76.75
